Jack Wilson McConnell, Baron McConnell of Glenscorrodale,  (born 30 June 1960) is a Scottish politician who served as First Minister of Scotland and Leader of the Labour Party in Scotland from 2001 to 2007. McConnell served as the Minister for Finance from 1999 to 2000 and Minister for Education, Europe and External Affairs from 2000 to 2001. He has been a Labour life peer in the House of Lords since 2010 and previously served as a Member of the Scottish Parliament (MSP) for Motherwell and Wishaw from 1999 to 2011.

Born in Irvine, Ayrshire, McConnell studied at the University of Stirling and worked as a mathematics teacher at Lornshill Academy. His political career began when he was elected to the Stirling District Council, while he was still teaching. He served as a member of the Scottish Constitutional Convention, having campaigned in-favour for a Scottish Parliament in the 1997 devolution referendum. Elected to serve as an MSP for the Motherwell and Wishaw constituency in the 1999 Scottish Parliament election, McConnell was appointed Minister for Finance under the Donald Dewar government. After Dewar's death in 2000, he ran unsuccessfully for the leadership of the Labour Party in Scotland, having been defeated by Henry McLeish. McLeish appointed McConnell as Minister for Education, Europe and External Affairs.

In 2001, McLeish resigned in the aftermath of the Officegate scandal and McConnell was elected unopposed as the Scottish Labour leader. He was appointed First Minister on 22 November 2001, becoming the youngest office holder. As first minister, he implemented a ban on smoking in public places, signed a Co-operation Agreement with Malawi, and successfully bid for the 2014 Commonwealth Games to be hosted in Glasgow. In the 2007 Scottish Parliament election, the Labour Party in Scotland became the second largest party, with the SNP having one seat more. This therefore lead to McConnell losing office, becoming the first First Minister to have been defeated from office.

After losing office as first minister, McConnell sat as the Leader of the Opposition in Holyrood, until his resignation as leader. He sat as a backbencher and stood down as an MSP in the 2011 election. In 2010, McConnell became a member of the House of Lords of the United Kingdom. He made a commitment to continuing his work to tackle poverty in Africa and to develop the relationship between Scotland and Malawi.

Early life

Birth and family 
Jack Wilson McConnell was born on 30 June 1960 in Irvine, Ayrshire. He is the eldest of four children born to William Wilson McConnell (1937–2018) and Elizabeth McCallum McConnell (née Jack; 1936–2020). McConnell was brought up on Glenscorrodale Farm near Lamlash on the Isle of Arran, where his father was a sheep farmer and a member of the  Arran Farmer’s Society. He was educated at Lamlash Primary and Arran High School.

Education and early career 
McConnell attended the University of Stirling, where he was President of the Students' Association from 1980 to 1982 and National Union of Students Scotland Vice-President from 1982 to 1983. He met Margo MacDonald and Richard Leonard at university. In the late 1970s, he occupied the principal's office in protest against student homelessness. He also took part in a siege to occupy the administration offices at the university and slept in sleeping bags in the university’s court room. He graduated in 1983 with a BSc Dip Ed.

After graduating, McConnell worked as a mathematics teacher at Lornshill Academy in Alloa, Clackmannanshire. In 1984, McConnell was elected to the Stirling District Council, while still teaching at Lornshill. He served as Treasurer from 1988 until 1992, and was the Leader of the council from 1990 to 1992.

Early political involvement 
McConnell initially joined the Scottish National Party when he was 16 years old. After trying to come to terms with Scottish nationalism, he suspended his membership and instead joined the Scottish Labour Party when he was 19.

From 1992 to 1998, McConnell served as the General Secretary of the Labour Party in Scotland. His major breakthrough was in his handling of the 1997 General Election success, where Labour attained a large overall majority victory over the Conservatives. Together the Labour Party in Scotland, the Scottish Liberal Democrats, and the Scottish National Party eliminated every seat the Conservatives held in Scotland. In 1998, he served as a member of the Scottish Constitutional Convention where he pioneered the Scottish devolution referendum success, establishing the Scottish Parliament.

As a strong proponent of Scottish devolution, McConnell helped push for reform. Between 1989 and 1998 he was a member of the Scottish Constitutional Convention, where he was playing an important role in the creation of the Scotland Act, which created a Scottish Parliament for the first time.

Member of the Scottish Parliament (1999–2001)

Election to Holyrood 
As General Secretary, he managed Labour Party in Scotland's successful YES YES devolution referendum campaign in 1997. Following the successful devolution campaign and the creation of a Scottish Parliament, McConnell was elected as an MSP, for Motherwell and Wishaw, in the first Scottish Parliament in May 1999.

Finance Minister; 1999–2000 
He was appointed immediately by Donald Dewar, the then First Minister, to the post of Minister of Finance. As Finance Minister one of his primary jobs was to establish the budgeting procedures for the new Scottish government, which included consulting the public on budget priorities. As Minister responsible for External Relations he established Concordats with the UK Government and opened Scotland House in Brussels.

McConnell was elected an MSP in the first Scottish Parliament elections in 1999. He was appointed Minister for Finance in the new Scottish Executive by then First Minister Donald Dewar. One of his first moves as Finance Minister was to establish the budgeting procedures for the new Scottish Executive, including publishing a consultation document asking the public and MSPs how the budget should be spent. His department also passed the Public Finance and Accountability (Scotland) Act 2000 through Parliament, which set out the finance and auditing procedures of the Executive.

Education Minister; 2000–2001 

On 11 October 2000, Dewar died of a brain haemorrhage. After the Labour leadership intervened to stop the Enterprise Minister Henry McLeish being appointed Dewar's successor without a vote, McConnell stood in the leadership contest. The election was held on Saturday 21 October, only 72 hours after Dewar's funeral, and the surprise result saw McConnell defeated with 36 votes to McLeish's 44 votes.

McLeish appointed him Minister for Education, Europe and External Affairs. Some analysts considered this post to be a "poisoned chalice", as he would be required to resolve both a crisis in the Scottish Qualifications Authority over exam marking, and pay disputes with the teaching unions.

Leadership of the Scottish Labour Party
McLeish resigned as first minister on 8 November 2001 over the Officegate scandal, regarding the sub let of his constituency office. McConnell was seen by many political analysts as the likely successor and he later launched his bid for leader. On 13 November, McConnell made a press conference in Edinburgh after reports emerged he had an extra-marital affair seven years prior. He admitted to having an affair and in a statement with his wife, Bridget McConnell, he stated: "If I become first minister, it would be very wrong for my family or anybody else to suffer because my behaviour then is still a secret today. That is why we are now being open about the fact that I did have an affair seven years ago. At the time I made mistakes, including denying the facts publicly and privately".

McConnell emerged as the only candidate and on 17 November, he was officially elected unopposed as Leader of the Labour Party in Scotland after receiving the support of 97.23% of MSPs. In his acceptance speech, he stated he was "deeply honoured to receive such overwhelming support" and highlighted that much work still needed to be done "to make devolution a success" and achieve "first class public services".

First Minister of Scotland (2001–2007)

First term; 2001–2003 

 
McConnell was nominated for the post of First Minister by a vote of the Scottish Parliament on 22 November, defeating Scottish National Party leader John Swinney, Scottish Conservative leader David McLetchie and Independent MSP Dennis Canavan by 70 votes to 34, 19 and 3 respectively. On 27 November, the Queen issued him a Royal Warrant of Appointment and he was sworn in at the Court of Session in Edinburgh. As a result of him becoming First Minister, he was appointed Keeper of the Great Seal of Scotland and to the Privy Council, earning the title 'The Right Honourable' for life. McConnell continued to led the Labour-Liberal Democrat coalition that had existed under the Dewar and McLeish administrations.

Cabinet appointments 

Shortly after being appointed McConnell began making appointments to his cabinet. Jim Wallace remained in the post of deputy first minister while Cathy Jamieson took over Mr McConnell's education brief and Wendy Alexander and Ross Finnie remained as ministers. Sam Galbraith and Angus MacKay stood down and Jackie Baillie, Sarah Boyack and Tom McCabe reshuffled out of government, while Susan Deacon was offered the post of social justice minister but refused the offer and moved to the backbenches. Cathy Jamieson, Mike Watson, Malcolm Chisholm, Iain Gray, Patricia Ferguson and Andy Kerr were all promoted to cabinet.

Sporting event bids 
In February 2002, Scotland joined forces with the Republic of Ireland in a bid to host the 2008 European Football Championship. McConnell was initially unconvinced that it was worth spending around £100 million on the tournament, but he later put his support behind the joint bid with the Irish.

Although the bid lost out to Austria/Switzerland, McConnell later supported other attempts to land major supporting events including London's successful bid for the 2012 Olympic Games and Glasgow's bid for the 2014 Commonwealth Games.

Sectarianism 
In December 2002, McConnell launched his government's campaign against sectarianism.

Second term; 2003–2007 

McConnell was re elected MSP for Motherwell and Wishaw at the Scottish Parliament elections. The Labour Party in Scotland won 50 seats, the largest number, and formed another coalition government with the Liberal Democrats which won 17 seats. On 15 May, McConnell was re appointed First Minister of Scotland and on the same day the Scottish government published A Partnership for a Better Scotland which set out the government's priorities for the four-year term ahead.

This was followed by the “Fresh Talent initiative” which was created and developed to focus at addressing the demographic decline in Scotland and ageing Scottish population by attracting young and skilled immigrants, primarily from other European Union countries (such as Poland and Slovakia primarily) to be attracted to Scotland as a place to live and work.

Public smoking ban 
One of McConnell's most famous achievements during his tenure in government was the successful campaign to ban smoking in Scottish public places, such as pubs, public transport and restaurants, making Scotland the first country within the United Kingdom to do so, which lead to McConnell receiving praise for his leadership on this issue, ultimately leading other countries to follow.

McConnell attended the 31st G8 summit which was held in Gleneagles Hotel, Scotland, and welcomed guests invited to the conference to Glasgow Prestwick Airport on arrival.

2007 Scottish election 

The Scottish Parliament general election of 3 May 2007 saw McConnell re elected as the MSP for Motherwell and Wishaw with a majority of 5,938 votes, representing 48% of the vote with a turnout of 50.3%. The Labour Party in Scotland was defeated by the SNP with the SNP winning 47 seats to Labour's 46, leaving the SNP short of an overall majority in the Parliament.

Post premiership

Labour in opposition; 2007–2011

Leader of the Opposition 
As Labour was left the second largest party in Holyrood, the SNP was invited first to form a government. The Lib Dems turned down a coalition deal with the SNP and Scottish Greens and ruled out a deal with Labour. On 16 May 2007, the election to nominate a first minister in the Scottish Parliament was held, with Alex Salmond receiving 49 votes to 46, as the Lib Dems and Conservatives abstained. The following day, the SNP officially formed the first nationalist administration of the Scottish Executive and McConnell became Leader of the Opposition. 

On 17 May 2007, McConnell told Salmond he would abstain in a Parliament vote to appoint ministers. In his first speech as opposition leader, McConnell listed a series of 'hypocritical' remarks that SNP ministers had made about the Labour administration.

As Leader of the Opposition in Holyrood, McConnell took part in First Minister's Questions (FMQs). In one session of FMQs, he claimed the new SNP administration was making several U-turns on transport policy and its position on student debt and council taxes.

Resignation as leader 
On 15 August 2007, McConnell announced his intention to resign as Leader of the Labour Party in Scotland. In a statement, he said it was his "honour" to serve as leader and empathised the need for Labour to learn lessons following its defeat in May. Immediately after his resignation, he was nominated by Prime Minister Gordon Brown to succeed Richard Wildash as British High Commissioner to Malawi. McConnell was succeeded as leader by Wendy Alexander.

Backbench MSP 
After his resignation, McConnell sat in Labour's opposition backbenches at Holyrood and continued to represent his Motherwell and Wishaw constituency until the 2011 Scottish Parliament election. On 28 May 2010, it was announced that McConnell would be made a life peer and enter the House of Lords as a working peer on behalf of the Labour Party.

House of Lords; 2010–present 

On 28 June 2010, he was created a life peer as Baron McConnell of Glenscorrodale, of the Isle of Arran in Ayrshire and Arran, and was introduced in the House of Lords the same day. In August 2010 he announced that he would not be seeking re-election to the Scottish Parliament.

Other positions
In August 2007, he was appointed an adviser to the Clinton Hunter Development Initiative in Malawi and Rwanda, and in October 2008, he was appointed by Gordon Brown as the Prime Minister's Special Representative on Conflict Resolution Mechanisms, a position which ceased following Labour's defeat in the 2010 General election.

He is a UK Ambassador for Action for Children; a Fellow of the 48 Group Club, which promotes relationships between the United Kingdom and China and an Ambassador for Pump Aid. On 8 March 2012, Optical Express announced the appointment of Lord McConnell of Glenscorrodale joining the Board as non executive director. He was a non executive director at DCM (Optical Holdings) from 2011 to 2015. As of 30 November 2018 McConnell holds the position of Chancellor at the University of Stirling.

Personal life
In 1990, McConnell married to Bridget McConnell, a cultural administrator and former Chief Executive Officer of Glasgow Life. They met in the late 1980s, where they both worked in Stirling District Council. On 5 March 1991, a sheriff ruled McConnell could become the legal father of Bridget's children, Hannah and Mark; whom she had in her previous marriage with Richard Brown. During McConnell's leadership bid for the Scottish Labour Party in November 2001, he revealed in a press conference that he had been involved in an extra marital affair seven years previously. He admitted the affair had been "an open secret for seven years" and "It caused significant hurt to a number of people and I regret that very much to this day".

In 2016, McConnell refused to bail out his sister, Anne McConnell, who was jailed for stealing £9,000 from a disabled pensioner's bank account. She told police she needed money to pay her mortgage and blamed her crime on her menopause and hoped "Jack would help her pay it back".

See also
Politics of Scotland
Premiership of Jack McConnell

References

Sources
Davidson, Lorraine. Lucky Jack: Scotland's First Minister (2005), Black and White Publishing.

External links

 

|-

|-

|-

|-

1960 births
Living people
People educated at Arran High School
Alumni of the University of Stirling
Finance ministers of Scotland
First Ministers of Scotland
Labour MSPs
Labour Party (UK) life peers
Life peers created by Elizabeth II
Members of the Privy Council of the United Kingdom
Members of the Scottish Parliament 1999–2003
Members of the Scottish Parliament 2003–2007
Members of the Scottish Parliament 2007–2011
People from Irvine, North Ayrshire
People from the Isle of Arran
Scottish schoolteachers
Leaders of Scottish Labour